Epiphthora poliopasta is a moth of the family Gelechiidae. It was described by Turner in 1919. It is found in Australia, where it has been recorded from Queensland.

The wingspan is about 13 mm. The forewings are whitish uniformly irrorated with ochreous-grey and with a few blackish scales but no defined dots. The hindwings are whitish-grey.

References

Moths described in 1919
Epiphthora